Adrien Lejeune (3 June 1847 – 9 January 1942) was a French revolutionary who is recognized as the last surviving communard from the 1871 Paris Commune.

Life
Adrien Félix Lejeune was born on June 3, 1847, in Bagnolet.  As a member of the National Guard, he participated in the 1870 Paris uprising against Napoleon III.  Although initially discharged for health reasons, Lejeune reenlisted to fight against the Prussians during the Siege of Paris as part of the 2nd Company of the 28th Battalion.  On March 18, 1871, he participated in the defense of the cannons of Montmartre against the French government at the onset of the Paris Commune.  Over the next two months under the Paris Commune, Lejeune participated in skirmishes in Bagnolet and the XXe arrondissement, culminating with action during the Bloody Week in May 1871.  On May 28th, the final day of the Paris Commune, Lejeune was arrested in Belleville.  On February 12, 1872, he was sentenced to five years in prison, eventually reduced to four years.

After the Russian Revolution of 1917, the Paris Commune was idolized by the Soviet government and Lejeune was later invited to settle in the Soviet Union where he moved in 1928.  By the time of his death in Novosibirsk in 1942, Lejeune was recognized as the last surviving communard at 94 years' old.  Originally buried in the Soviet Union, his ashes were repatriated on the initiative of the French Communist Party and buried in Père Lachaise Cemetery, Paris, on May 23, 1971, as part of the centenary celebrations of the Paris Commune.

References

Further reading
 Bowd, Gavin (2016). The Last Communard: Adrian Lejeune, the Unexpected Life of a Revolutionary. Verso Books.

Communards
Burials at Père Lachaise Cemetery
1847 births
1942 deaths